The 2001 FIFA Club World Championship was a football tournament arranged by FIFA to take place in Spain from 28 July to 12 August 2001. It was supposed to be the second edition of the FIFA Club World Championship, after the first edition in 2000, but was cancelled owing to a combination of factors such as the collapse of FIFA's marketing partner ISL. FIFA had originally planned to postpone the tournament until 2003.

Host bids
The FIFA Executive Committee appointed Spain as tournament hosts on 3 August 2000 during their meeting in Zürich, Switzerland.

Qualified teams

The clubs invited to the 2001 tournament were:

Notes

Venues
The following cities/venues were planned to be used for the tournament:

Group stage
The group stage draw was held on 6 March 2001 at the Congress Centre in A Coruña, Spain.

Group A
 Boca Juniors
 Deportivo La Coruña
 Wollongong Wolves
 Zamalek

Group B
 Al-Hilal
 Galatasaray
 Olimpia
 Palmeiras

Group C
 Hearts of Oak
 Júbilo Iwata
 Los Angeles Galaxy
 Real Madrid

Knockout stage

Semi-finals

Match for third place

Final

References

External links
2001 FIFA Club World Championship at Rec.Sport.Soccer Statistics Foundation

2001
Club World Championship
Cancelled association football competitions
2001–02 in Spanish football